is a Japanese business executive and the current vice president of Toyota Motor Corporation.

Career
In 1972, Koji Kobayashi graduated from Shiga University and joined Toyota Motor Industry Corporation (later, Toyota Motor Corporation). In 2000, he became the chief manager of the 3rd sales department, was sent on loan to Toyota Financial Services in 2000 and to DENSO Corporation. In 2010, he became representative director and vice president of Denso. He came back to Toyota Motor Corporation as the adviser in 2016 and became vice president of Toyota Motor Corporation in 2018, holding the post of director of Toyota Financial Services. He has been introduced by Shūkan Gendai as the person with the straight talk, nicknamed "Destroyer" or "Idea Man" who calls the president "Toyoda-kun" (The suffix "-kun" is used when the superior speaks to the male junior in the office), as the tower of strength to President Akio Toyoda, and as the  person who does not fear demotion and gives fear to 370,000 employees.

References

External links
Koji Kobayashi, Operating Officer

1948 births
Living people
People from Nagoya
Shiga University alumni
Toyota people